The Stand is an American post-apocalyptic fantasy television miniseries, based on the 1978 novel of the same name by Stephen King and a remake to the 1994 adaptation. The plot centers on a pandemic resulting from a mishap at a military biological research station which allows the escape of a lethal strain of influenza. After the pandemic kills almost the entire world population, the few survivors are drawn to one of two figures, Randall Flagg and Mother Abagail, setting up a final good-vs-evil confrontation. In the novel's dedication to his wife, King describes it as a "dark tale of the ageless struggle between good and evil." The adaptation alters details (gender, race, age, etc.) of some of the main characters, moves the setting to modern-day 21st century, and features a new final episode written by King, making it the third variation of the story's conclusion. The first episode was released on CBS All Access on December 17, 2020.  The series received mixed reviews.

Premise
The Stand is described in CBS publicity as "King's apocalyptic vision of a world decimated by plague and embroiled in an elemental struggle between good and evil. The fate of mankind rests on the frail shoulders of the 108-year-old Mother Abagail and a handful of survivors. Their worst nightmares are embodied by a man with a lethal smile and unspeakable powers: Randall Flagg, the nefarious 'Dark Man.

Cast

Main

 James Marsden as Stu Redman
 Whoopi Goldberg as Mother Abagail Freemantle
 Alexander Skarsgård as Randall Flagg
 Greg Kinnear as Glen Bateman
 Amber Heard as Nadine Cross
 Jovan Adepo as Larry Underwood
 Odessa Young as Frannie Goldsmith
 Owen Teague as Harold Lauder
 Henrique Zaga as Nick Andros
 Brad William Henke as Tom Cullen
 Nat Wolff as Lloyd Henreid
 Irene Bedard as Ray Brentner

Recurring
 Ezra Miller as Trashcan Man
 Natalie Martinez as Dayna Jurgens
 Gabrielle Rose as Judge Farris
 Gordon Cormier as Joe
 Katherine McNamara as Julie Lawry
 Fiona Dourif as the Rat Woman
 Eion Bailey as Teddy Weizak
 Olivia Cheng as Dr. Sylvia Wen

Guest starring
 J. K. Simmons as General William Starkey
 Angus Sampson as Garvey
 Heather Graham as Rita Blakemoor
 Clifton Collins Jr. as Bobby Terry
 Hamish Linklater as Dr. Jim Ellis
 Daniel Sunjata as Cobb
 Kristy Dawn Dinsmore as Maria
 Bryan Cranston as the President of the United States (voice; uncredited)
 Kendall Joy Hall as Young Abigail Freemantle

Cameos
 Stephen King makes a cameo appearance (uncredited) in "The House of the Dead" on an advertisement for Hemingford Home.
 Mick Garris makes a cameo appearance (uncredited) in "The Circle Closes" as a resident of the Boulder Free Zone.

Episodes

Production

Development
In January 2011, Warner Bros. Pictures and CBS Films were developing a feature-length film adaptation of author Stephen King's 1978 novel The Stand, which had previously been adapted as a 1994 miniseries. In August 2011, David Yates was hired to direct with Steve Kloves writing the screenplay. They subsequently left the project with Yates later explaining that he felt it would work better as a miniseries. In October 2011, Ben Affleck was named as the new director. In January 2012, David Kajganich was hired to write the screenplay. In an interview in November 2012, Affleck admitted that he was having difficulty with the adaptation.

According to Kajganich, when he was hired, the plan was to make a two-film adaptation. Kajganich claimed he finished the first draft of part one, only for Warner Bros. to change their minds and change the project to a single film. Kajganich then scripted a one-film version. In August 2013, Scott Cooper replaced Affleck as director. In November 2013, Cooper left the project. Cooper later stated that he was unable to make the story fit into one film.

On February 25, 2014, Josh Boone was hired to write and direct the adaptation. He later revealed that he wanted Christian Bale to play Randall Flagg and Matthew McConaughey for the role of Stu Redman. By September 10, 2014, the script had been completed and pre-production was underway. In November, Boone planned to split his adaptation into four full-length feature films in an effort to remain true to the breadth of King's sprawling novel.

In June 2015, Warner Bros. proposed an eight-part Showtime miniseries to set up the story, which would culminate in Josh Boone's film. However, in February 2016, The Stand project was put on hold and the rights reverted to CBS Films.

In September 2017, King talked of doing an extended TV series on Showtime or CBS All Access. 
On March 30, 2018, it was reported that CBS All Access were redeveloping the project into a ten-hour limited series with Boone still attached to serve as director. In January 2019, a 10-hour limited series was ordered by CBS Television Studios to be broadcast on CBS All Access. The production features Stephen King's son Owen King as a producer and writer, and a new ending written by Stephen King. The episode count was reduced to nine episodes after the writing process had finished.

Casting
In June 2019, James Marsden, Amber Heard, Whoopi Goldberg, Greg Kinnear, Odessa Young and Henry Zaga were all in consideration for the roles of Stu Redman, Nadine Cross, Mother Abagail, Glen Bateman, Frannie Goldsmith and Nick Andros, respectively. On July 8, Marilyn Manson confirmed in an interview with Revolver that he had been cast in an undisclosed role and also recorded a cover of The Doors' "The End" with Shooter Jennings that would be included in the miniseries. However, this cover could not be used due to the series' tight budget.

By August 1, Marsden, Heard, Young, and Zaga were all cast in the series. According to news reports, Stephen King has written an entirely different ending to the final chapter of the series that is also different from the book as well as a coda. In addition, the last episodes will be written by King and his son Owen. On September 11 Alexander Skarsgård was cast as Randall Flagg. Also confirmed cast members include Goldberg, Jovan Adepo, Owen Teague, Brad William Henke, and Daniel Sunjata for the roles of Mother Abagail, Larry Underwood, Harold Lauder, Tom Cullen, and Cobb respectively.

By September 13, 2019, production on the series had begun. In October, Nat Wolff, Eion Bailey, Katherine McNamara, Hamish Linklater and Heather Graham were added to the cast.

Natalie Martinez was confirmed to have a role in the series in December 2019, and confirmed that she was playing Dayna Jurgens in the comments section of an Instagram post. In January 2020, Clifton Collins Jr. revealed on Instagram that he would play the minor role of Bobby Terry.

In his interview with GQ in March 2020, Ezra Miller confirmed they had a role in the series which was undisclosed but later revealed to be Trashcan Man. With this news, it was revealed that Marilyn Manson was in talks to play The Kid but that his part was cut out of the script during the writing process.

In May 2020, Vanity Fair revealed the first look at Gordon Cormier as Joe.

On August 19, 2020, Mick Garris, the director of the 1994 miniseries adaptation, confirmed that he would have a non-speaking cameo in the new series. On December 3, 2020, showrunner Ben Cavell revealed during the Television Critics Association virtual panel presentation for the series that Stephen King would have a cameo.

On August 7, 2019, the Daily Moth reported that Josh Boone cast a hearing actor (Henry Zaga) over a deaf actor for the role of a deaf character, Nick Andros. This sparked a backlash from multiple well-known deaf actors. A deaf man from Los Angeles, Jared Perez-DeBusk, had a brief conversation on Instagram with Boone, sharing the exchange in a vlog and showed screenshots in the comments section. In the comments, Boone explained that the deaf character, in his dreams and when he turns into a ghost, can speak and hear, so it is acceptable to have a hearing actor because the character is both deaf and hearing depending on whether he is asleep or awake. Boone said Zaga is a dedicated actor and has been hard at work learning ASL, and that there would be deaf consultants on set. CAD Media said on Twitter that there would be a meeting on August 7, 2019, between the miniseries' production team and CBS on this issue.

In August 2020, Fiona Dourif and Irene Bedard were cast as gender-swapped versions of The Rat Man and Ralph Brentner, respectively. On December 11, 2020, Gabrielle Rose's role as The Judge was confirmed.

On December 16, 2020, J. K. Simmons was confirmed to play a supporting character, later revealed to be General Starkey. Bryan Cranston has a voice cameo role as the President of the United States.

Filming
The production filmed in and near Vancouver, British Columbia from September 2019 to March 2020.

During filming, the working title "Radio Nowhere" was used. Specific filming locations included the Ladner Trunk Road in Ladner, British Columbia for some small town downtown areas and downtown Vancouver; for example, the latter was used for filming a dead body hanging from a building, as well as other "dead bodies, trash & debris, shouting of coarse language & gunfire", according to news reports. South Surrey’s (pink) Pacific Inn, the "quaint" downtown area of Port Coquitlam standing in for parts of Boulder, Colorado and other areas of the Lower Mainland.  Exteriors of the home of Mother Abagail were filmed at a house built for the production  in Ladner.

The production completed filming a few days before it would have been shut down due to the COVID-19 pandemic.

Music
The original score for the series was composed by Nate Walcott and Mike Mogis, who have contributed to Josh Boone's other works.

Release
The miniseries premiered on December 17, 2020, with a new episode that was released weekly. In March 2021, Amazon Prime Video began streaming the series in some countries.

Reception

On the review aggregator Rotten Tomatoes, it has an approval rating of 56%, based on 57 critic reviews. The website's critics consensus reads, "Despite an A-list cast and a smattering of poignant moments, The Stand extended runtime doesn't make for better storytelling, leaving its expansive cast stranded in a cluttered apocalypse." Metacritic gives it a weighted average score of 56 out of 100 based on 24 critic reviews, indicating "mixed to average reviews".

Accolades

Home media
Paramount Home Media Distribution released the series on Blu-ray on October 5, 2021.

References

External links
 
 

 

 

2020 American television series debuts
2020s American drama television miniseries
2021 American television series endings
American fantasy television series
Paramount+ original programming
English-language television shows
The Stand
Television series by CBS Studios
Television series by Vertigo Entertainment
Television shows filmed in Vancouver
Television shows about influenza outbreaks
Television shows based on works by Stephen King
Post-apocalyptic television series
Television shows set in Arkansas
Television shows set in Colorado
Television shows set in the Las Vegas Valley
Television shows set in Maine
Television shows set in Nebraska
Television shows set in New York City
Television shows set in Texas
Television shows about dreams
Television shows about nightmares